The women's 100 metres hurdles event at the 2005 European Athletics U23 Championships was held in Erfurt, Germany, at Steigerwaldstadion on 15 and 17 July.

Medalists

Results

Final
17 July
Wind: 0.9 m/s

Heats
15 July
Qualified: first 2 in each heat and 2 best to the Final

Heat 1
Wind: 0.6 m/s

Heat 2
Wind: -0.3 m/s

Heat 3
Wind: -1.8 m/s

Participation
According to an unofficial count, 21 athletes from 14 countries participated in the event.

 (1)
 (1)
 (1)
 (3)
 (3)
 (1)
 (2)
 (3)
 (1)
 (1)
 (1)
 (1)
 (1)
 (1)

References

100 metres hurdles
Sprint hurdles at the European Athletics U23 Championships